Vitaly Mefodievich Solomin (12 December 194127 May 2002) was a Soviet and Russian actor, director and screenwriter, best remembered for playing Dr. Watson in a series of Sherlock Holmes adaptations for Soviet television. He was the younger brother of Yury Solomin.

Biography
Vitaly Solomin was born in 1941 in Chita, Zabaykalsky Krai, Soviet Union, to a family of professional musicians. From childhood he was fascinated by music and learned to play the piano. On leaving school he went to Moscow and in 1959 he entered Shchepkin's drama school. He studied in the class of Nikolay Annenkov.

While a student, Vitaly rehearsed and performed at the Maly Theatre. After finishing the school he became an actor at this theater.

In the 1960s Vitaly Solomin began to appear in films. He debuted in 1963 in 1 Newton street. His first big role was as Kirill in the 1966 film Elder sister.

Vitaly Solomin shot to fame after playing the leading role as Cossack Roman in the epic film Dauria (1971) where he worked with his brother Yury Solomin and other Russian stars, such as Yefim Kopelyan, Viktor Pavlov and Vasily Shukshin.

During the 1980s his performances in films directed by Igor Maslennikov were especially successful. Most famous of these was his role as Dr. Watson in a series of films about Sherlock Holmes (1979—1986). In 1982 Maslennikov invited him to play the role of Count Tomsky in The Queen of Spades, an adaptation of Alexander Pushkin's story. His work in the film series Winter Cherry was very successful.

From 1 September 1986 to September 1989 Solomin worked in the Mossovet Theatre. There he acted in a play based on Viktor Astafyev's Sad Detective. In 1991 he returned to the Maly Theatre and staged Alexander Ostrovsky's Savage, playing the role of Ashmetiev.

Solomin wrote the screenplay for and directed the 1994 film The Hunt.

On 4 November 1974, he received the title of Honored Artist of the RSFSR, and on 3 February 1992 of People's Artist of the RSFSR. In April 2002, Vitaly Solomin suffered a stroke which proved to be fatal; he died on 27 May 2002 and is interred in Vagankovo Cemetery.

Private life
Vitaly Solomin's first wife was the actress Natalia Rudnaya. The marriage soon fell apart. On October 28, 1970, he married the actress Maria Solomina (née Leonidova). In 1974 they had a daughter Anastasia, and in May 1984 a daughter Yelizaveta.

Filmography

References

External links
 
  Biography
  Biography online peoples.ru
 To Be Remembered. Vitaly Solomin by Leonid Filatov (2003)

1941 births
2002 deaths
20th-century Russian male actors
21st-century Russian male actors
People from Chita, Zabaykalsky Krai
Honored Artists of the RSFSR
People's Artists of the RSFSR
Recipients of the Order "For Merit to the Fatherland", 4th class
Russian male film actors
Russian male stage actors
Russian male television actors
Russian theatre directors
Soviet male film actors
Soviet male stage actors
Soviet male television actors
Burials at Vagankovo Cemetery